Fátima Rocio Acuña Insfrán (born 14 August 1999) is a Paraguayan handball player for Nueva Estrella and the Paraguay national team.

She was selected to represent Paraguay at the 2017 World Women's Handball Championship.

Achievements
2021 South and Central American Women's Handball Championship: All star team left wing

References

1999 births
Living people
Paraguayan female handball players
20th-century Paraguayan women
21st-century Paraguayan women